Highland Beach may refer to a location in the United States:

 Highland Beach, Florida, a town in Palm Beach County
 Highland Beach, Maryland
 Highland Beach, Wisconsin, an unincorporated community

Fictional
 Highland Beach (The 4400), a Seattle-area lakeshore in the television show The 4400